This is the discography documenting albums and singles released by American R&B singer Sisqó.

Albums

Studio albums

Compilation albums

EPs

Singles 

 "—" denotes releases that did not chart

Featured singles

Guest appearances

Notes 
 1 A remix, "Thong Song Uncensored", features Foxy Brown and is included on the soundtrack LP for the film Nutty Professor 2: The Klumps
 2 Edited version titled "What You Want"

Soundtrack appearances

Music videos

Home Videos

Unreleased Songs

Mixtape songs 
 2001: "This Is the Heart" (King of the Hill featuring Sisqó)
 2003: "In Da Club"
 2004: "One Love"
 2004: "Really Real"
 2004: "So Seductive"
 2005: "One Finger"
 2005: "Sexy Things" (featuring Mr. Cheeks)
 2005: "I Got It" (Sypha featuring Sisqó)
 2006: "Go Dumb" (featuring Mikel C.)
 2007: "Cherry Mountain"
 2008: "Champagne and Hennessy"
 2008: "Let Me Hump on You" (Busta Rhymes featuring Sisqó)
 2009: "Set It Off"
 2009: "Put Me On"
 2009: "Girl You Can Get It" (featuring Petey Pablo)
 2009: "So Bad"
 2009: "Caught Up"

Other songs 
 2000: "Every Breath You Take" (Performed live with Sting, D'Angelo, Backstreet Boys, Tom Jones, Christina Aguilera and Enrique Iglesias)
 2001: "Between the Sheets"
 2001: "Tears" (Performed with Gerald Levert and Kelly Price at the 2001 Soul Train Music Awards)
 2007: "I Miss You"
 2008: "Pop That" (Produced by Timbaland)
 2009: "Club on Fire"
 2009: "Already Know"
 2009: "Club 2 Tha Bedroom"
 2009: "Act a Donkey"
 2009: "Back Away"
 2010: "Billie Jean (Dragon Remix)"
 2010: "Boy Shorts"
 2010: "Bounce"
 2010: "O"
 2010: "Star"
 2013: "All Night"
 2014: "Earthquake (Shake Shake)"
 2014: "Let's Get Down Tonight"
 2014: "Like a Mothaf*cker (Dance)"
 2014: "You the Finest"
 2014: "I Let That Money Go"
 2014: "The One"
 2019: "It's a Man's World"
 2020: "Sisqó Live"

References

Sisqo